Aghahoorin is a townland in the area of Boho, County Fermanagh, Northern Ireland.

As far back as 1659 (Census of Ireland) this townland was known as Agharrin; later on it was known as Achadh Guirthin or Achadh Urthin "field of the suret" (1833). This townland is known for a fort on a hill and the remains of a sandstone quarry which was used to supply headstones for the local graveyards. The townland contains karst features which include the shake hole known as Pollkeeran and a rattle hole known as Murphy's Hole. as well as a Scheduled Historic Monument: a Bivallate rath, grid ref: H1185 4573.

References

Townlands of County Fermanagh
Archaeological sites in County Fermanagh